Tritia lima is a species of sea snail, a marine gastropod mollusk in the family Nassariidae.

Description
The size of an adult shell varies between 5 mm and 35 mm.

Distribution
This species occurs in the Mediterranean Sea off Greece and in the temperate North Atlantic.

References

 Cernohorsky W. O. (1984). Systematics of the family Nassariidae (Mollusca: Gastropoda). Bulletin of the Auckland Institute and Museum 14: 1–356
 Smriglio C., Mariottini P. & Calascibetta S. (1999). Description of a new species of Conidae Fleming, 1822 from the Mediterranean Sea: Conopleura aliena n. sp. Bollettino Malacologico 34(1–4): 27-32 page(s): 27–32
 Gofas, S.; Le Renard, J.; Bouchet, P. (2001). Mollusca, in: Costello, M.J. et al. (Ed.) (2001). European register of marine species: a check-list of the marine species in Europe and a bibliography of guides to their identification. Collection Patrimoines Naturels, 50: pp. 180–213

External links
 Gastropods.com: Conopleura aliena
  Nappo A., Rey X., Pellegrinii D., Bonomolo G., & Crocetta F., 2018 - Revisiting the disjunct distribution of Conopleura Hinds, 1844. Zootaxa 4392 (3)

lima
Gastropods described in 1817